Kelvin Ebuka Nwamora (born 31 October 1993 in Enugu, Nigeria) is a Nigerian football striker, who played for FC Inhulets Petrove in the Ukrainian First League.

Career 
Nwamora started his career when he was signed for Kapfenberger SV in the Austrian Football First League. Then in July 2015 he signed a contract with Ukrainian club FC Olimpik and made his debut for FC Olimpik in the match against FC Karpaty Lviv on 1 August 2015 in the Ukrainian Premier League.

Controversy 
Before 2014 Nwamora played in Ukraine in the local amateur clubs and his birth date was 31 October 1988, but from 2015 his birth date is changed to 31 October 1993. He changed his birth date during playing time in Austria in 2014-2015.

References

External links 

1993 births
Living people
Nigerian footballers
Nigerian expatriate footballers
Kapfenberger SV players
FC Olimpik Donetsk players
Expatriate footballers in Austria
Expatriate footballers in Ukraine
Ukrainian Premier League players
Nigerian expatriate sportspeople in Austria
Nigerian expatriate sportspeople in Ukraine
FC Inhulets Petrove players
Association football forwards
Footballers from Enugu